Edward David Docwra (born 24 April 1953) is an English former first-class cricketer and educator.

Docwra was born at Paddington in April 1953. He was educated at Canford School, before going up to Worcester College, Oxford. While studying at Oxford, he made a single appearances in first-class cricket for Oxford University against Worcestershire at Oxford in 1974. Batting twice in the match, he was dismissed for 6 runs in the Oxford first innings by John Inchmore, while in their second innings he was dismissed for 20 runs by Jim Cumbes.

After graduating from Oxford, Docwra became a schoolteacher. He emigrated to Australia, where he taught for 37 years at St Peter's College, Adelaide. After his retirement in 2015, the college set up the David Docwra Scholarship in recognition of his long service.

References

External links

1953 births
Living people
People from Paddington
People educated at Canford School
Alumni of Worcester College, Oxford
English cricketers
Oxford University cricketers
Australian schoolteachers
English emigrants to Australia